The Grinnall Scorpion III, by Grinnall Specialist Cars, is a reverse trike, with two wheels at the front and one at the rear, which is a better-handling configuration than one wheel at the front. Designed in 1991 by Steve Harper, the Scorpion III features a GRP body tub which is bonded to a space frame chassis underneath, and employs a BMW K-series motorcycle engine as its power plant. The engine, gearbox and final drive from the motorcycle are utilised with a special rear wheel which is fitted with a car tyre, as are the front wheels. It has a very good power-to-weight ratio which endows it with excellent performance.

The motorcycle sequential gearchange is retained and operated via a gear shift inside the cockpit and requires a forward or backward movement to change gear. The brake, accelerator and clutch operate as per a car and are adjustable for reach to accommodate drivers of different size. The seat and steering wheel are fixed in position.

Handling is generally considered to be good due to the low centre of gravity and wide front track (approx ) although care is needed when roads are wet.

There are two seats, and there is provision above the engine to accommodate some luggage which is roughly equivalent to two sports bags.

The trikes are sold as complete kits with everything needed to finish including washers, ty-wraps etc. or as completed vehicles. They are essentially recreational vehicles which offer high performance but lack the practicality of a conventional car.

See also
 Campagna T-Rex - a similar Canadian three wheeler
 List of motorized trikes

External links 
Grinnall Specialist Cars Ltd. official website
Grinnall Scorpion Owners Club

Grinnall vehicles
Three-wheeled motor vehicles